Beatrice of Navarre (1242? – 1295), was Duchess of Burgundy, by marriage to Hugh IV, Duke of Burgundy. She was a daughter of Theobald I of Navarre and his third wife Margaret of Bourbon. Her siblings included Theobald II of Navarre and Henry I of Navarre. She is also known as Beatrix of Champagne.

Life
Beatrice was married to Hugh IV, Duke of Burgundy. Upon the marriage, Beatrice became Duchess of Burgundy.

Beatrice’s son Hugh did not succeed his father because Hugh IV had another son, Robert, by his marriage to Yolande de Dreux. Hugh IV died in 1271 and was succeeded by Robert. After her husband died, Beatrice retired to the château de l'Isle-sur-Serein. She quarrelled with her stepson Robert, and asked for protection from Philip II of France. She also renounced any claim to the succession of her brother in 1273.

Issue
Hugh and Beatrice had the following children:
Hugh (died in 1288), viscount of Avallon, married Margaret de Salins
Beatrice, Lady of Grignon, married Hugh XIII of Lusignan
Isabella of Burgundy, Queen of Germany
Margaret, Dame de Vitteaux (died after 1300), married John I of Chalon-Arlay
Joan, a nun

References

1242 births
1295 deaths
13th-century nobility from the Kingdom of Navarre
Navarrese infantas
Duchesses of Burgundy
Daughters of kings